The Castlereagh Knights were an ice hockey team that played in the British National League during the 1996-97 season. The team played at the Dundonald Ice Bowl in Belfast, Northern Ireland.

References

Ice hockey teams in the United Kingdom
Ice hockey teams in Ireland
Sports teams in Northern Ireland
Ice hockey in Northern Ireland
Sports clubs in Belfast